Glenn de Randamie (born 6 August 1984), better known by his stage name Typhoon, is a Dutch rapper. He is signed to Dutch hip-hop record label Top Notch.

Biography 
Typhoon was born and raised in the Dutch town of 't Harde. Inspired by his brother Blaxtar, Typhoon started writing at the age of 12 and as a rap artist with the group Rudeteenz, which he joined in when he was 15. It consisted of him, Blaxtar and the well-known Dutch hip-hop formation Opgezwolle. He made some guest appearances for Opgezwolle before winning Grote Prijs, the biggest hip-hop prize in the Netherlands. In the same year he got his VWO diploma at Carolus Clusius College in Zwolle.

After winning Grote Prijs, Typhoon signed to the record label Top Notch. He started making separate thematic songs for a Dutch music channel called "The Box" with the producer Nav. The themes varied from religion and sexism to money and sex. In 2006 he started working on his solo debut Tussen Licht en Lucht which was released the next year. In 2009 he formed the group Fakkelbrigade with Dutch rappers Rico and Sticks (from Opgezwolle) and ART. Later that year he received the Zilveren Harp, a Dutch prize for upcoming artists. Typhoon also went to Kenya for development aid with the organization Edukans. In 2010 he brought out an eight track EP called Chocolade with the New Cool Collective.

In 2014, Typhoon released his second solo-album to critical acclaim; Lobi da Basi (Surinamese for Love rules) made him a festival-favourite with both hip-hop and pop-audiences.

In 2016, Typhoon was in the news after being pulled over. The reason this became a news topic was because the police officer considered it suspicious for a person of color to drive the expensive car he was driving.

In 2019, Typhoon announced that he was working on a new album. The album, titled Lichthuis was released in 2020.

Discography

Albums
2007: Tussen Licht en Lucht (peaked on NED No. 24 on Album Top 100)
2014: Lobi Da Basi
2020: Lichthuis

DVDs
"Buitenwesten" (with Opgezwolle, Jawat!, Kubus & DuvelDuvel)

Prizes

References

External links

Zwartgoud.net
Zuiderlucht.eu
Nrcnext.nl
Last.fm
Musicfrom.nl
3voor12.vpro.nl
Blogger.xs4all.nl

1984 births
Dutch rappers
Living people
Dutch people of Surinamese descent
People from Zwolle